A.J. Matthews (born January 23, 1988) is an American mixed martial artist who competes in the Welterweight division. A professional competitor since 2007, he has also competed for Bellator MMA, Strikeforce, RIZIN, and King of the Cage.

Mixed martial arts career

Early career
Matthews started his career in 2007. He fought mainly for Californian promotions such as King of the Cage and Gladiator Challenge. After four consecutive victories, Matthews signed with Strikeforce.

Strikeforce
Matthews faced Herman Terrado on April 9, 2011, at Strikeforce: Diaz vs. Daley. He had his first career's defeat via KO in the first round.

Bellator MMA
Matthews made his debut against Rudy Bears on October 8, 2011, at Bellator 53. He won via unanimous decision (29-28, 29–28, 29–28).

Matthews faced Charlie Rader on May 25, 2012, at Bellator 70. He won via KO in the second round.

Matthews faced Dom O'Grady on October 12, 2012, at Bellator 76. He lost via split decision (29-28 O'Grady, 29-28 Matthews, 29-28 O'Grady).

Fight Master: Bellator MMA
On May 6, 2013, it was announced that Matthews would be featured as a participant on Bellator MMA reality TV show Fight Master.

In the first episode, Matthews faced Strikeforce and Bellator veteran Darryl Cobb in a qualifying round for an opportunity to choose one of the four coaches of the show to work with. Matthews won via unanimous decision after three rounds and following his victory, he selected Randy Couture to be his coach.

In the seventh episode, Matthews faced two-time NCAA Division I All-American Eric Bradley in the round of 16 of the tournament. He was defeated via unanimous decision after two rounds.

Return to Bellator
Matthews faced Belal Muhammad at Bellator 112 on March 14, 2014. He lost the fight via unanimous decision.

Matthews faced Kyle Bolt at Bellator 131 on November 15, 2014. He won the fight via TKO in the first round.

Matthews was expected to face Ben Reiter at Bellator 137 on May 15, 2015. However, Matthews pulled out of the fight due to injury and was replaced by Benji Radach.

Matthews eventually returned to face Emiliano Sordi at Bellator 141 on August 28, 2015.  He won the fight via TKO after his opponent's corner stopped the fight between rounds one and two.

Matthews faced Ben Reiter at Bellator 156 on June 17, 2016. He lost a one-sided unanimous decision.

Matthews faced Hisaki Kato on October 21, 2016, at Bellator 162.  He lost the fight via TKO in the first round.

Matthews faced André Fialho at Bellator 181 on July 14, 2017. After a back-and-forth contest, in which both fighters were able to land significant strikes, hurting their opponent, ultimately Matthews lost the bout via split decision.

Matthews fought Kendall Grove at Bellator 193 on January 26, 2018. He won the fight by split decision.

Matthews faced Logan Storley on August 17, 2018, at Bellator 204. He lost the fight via technical knockout in round two.

On May 3, 2021, it was announced that Matthews was no longer under contract with Bellator.

Mixed martial arts record

|-
|Loss
|align=center|9–9
|David Rickels
|TKO (punch)
|Bellator 219
|
|align=center|2
|align=center|3:24
|Temecula, California, United States
|
|-
|Loss
|align=center|9–8
|Logan Storley
|TKO (elbows and punches)
|Bellator 204
|
|align=center|2
|align=center|3:56
|Sioux Falls, South Dakota, United States
|
|-
|Win
|align=center| 9–7
|Kendall Grove
|Decision (split)
|Bellator 193
|
|align=center|3
|align=center|5:00
|Temecula, California, United States
|
|-
|Loss
|align=center| 8–7
|André Fialho
|Decision (split)
|Bellator 181
|
|align=center|3
|align=center|5:00
|Thackerville, Oklahoma, United States
|
|-
|Loss
|align=center| 8–6
|Hisaki Kato
|TKO (punches)
|Bellator 162
|
|align=center|1
|align=center|4:58
|Memphis, Tennessee, United States
|
|-
| Loss
| align=center| 8–5
| Ben Reiter
| Decision (unanimous)
| Bellator 156
| 
| align=center| 3
| align=center| 5:00
| Fresno, California, United States
| 
|-
| Loss
| align=center| 8–4
| Anatoly Tokov
| KO (punch)
| Rizin World Grand Prix 2015: Part 1
| 
| align=center|1
| align=center|0:55 
| Saitama, Japan
| 
|- 
| Win
| align=center| 8–3
| Emiliano Sordi
| TKO (corner stoppage)
| Bellator 141
| 
| align=center| 1
| align=center| 5:00
| Temecula, California
| 
|-
| Win
| align=center| 7–3
| Kyle Bolt
| TKO (punches)
| Bellator 131
| 
| align=center| 1
| align=center| 1:39
| San Diego, California
|
|-
| Loss
| align=center| 6–3
| Belal Muhammad
| Decision (unanimous)
| Bellator 112
| 
| align=center| 3
| align=center| 5:00
| Hammond, Indiana
| 
|-
| Loss
| align=center| 6–2
| Dom O'Grady
| Decision (split)
| Bellator 76
| 
| align=center| 3
| align=center| 5:00
| Windsor, Ontario, Canada
| 
|-
| Win
| align=center| 6–1
| Charlie Rader
| KO (soccer kick)
| Bellator 70
| 
| align=center| 2
| align=center| 3:34
| New Orleans, Louisiana, United States
| 
|-
| Win
| align=center| 5–1
| Rudy Bears
| Decision (unanimous)
| Bellator 53
| 
| align=center| 3
| align=center| 5:00
| Miami, Oklahoma, United States
| 
|-
| Loss
| align=center| 4–1
| Herman Terrado
| KO (punch)
| Strikeforce: Diaz vs. Daley
| 
| align=center| 1
| align=center| 4:16
| San Diego, California, United States
| 
|-
| Win
| align=center| 4–0
| Sean Choice
| TKO (punches)
| PWP: War on the Mainland
| 
| align=center| 2
| align=center| 3:54
| Irvine, California, United States
| 
|-
| Win
| align=center| 3–0
| David Gomez
| Decision (unanimous)
| KOTC: Excessive Damage
| 
| align=center| 3
| align=center| 3:00
| Highland, California, United States
| 
|-
| Win
| align=center| 2–0
| Adam Figurski
| KO (punches)
| Gladiator Challenge: Venom
| 
| align=center| 1
| align=center| 0:23
| Pauma Valley, California, United States
| 
|-
| Win
| align=center| 1–0
| Daniel Morales
| TKO (punches)
| TC 19: Total Combat 19
| 
| align=center| 2
| align=center| N/A
| Yuma, Arizona, United States
|

References

1988 births
Living people
American male mixed martial artists
Welterweight mixed martial artists
Middleweight mixed martial artists
Mixed martial artists from California
Sportspeople from San Diego